Father Creeper is the second full-length album released on 3 March 2012, by the Johannesburg, South Africa-based artist Spoek Mathambo, and his second release on US label Sub Pop.

Track listing

References

External links
Father Creeper on Sub Pop
Spoek Mathambo on Sub Pop

2012 albums
Spoek Mathambo albums
Sub Pop albums